The coat of arms of Calgary, Alberta, was adopted in 1902. The arms existed only in black and white until 1984, when an alderman asked the city to develop it in full colour.

The King's Own Calgary Regiment (RCAC) uses a modified version of the city's arms as its regimental badge, and also uses the same motto, "Onward".

Symbols
Crest: A mural crown signifying loyalty, with a setting sun.
Shield: 
Chief: A setting sun over the Rocky Mountains
Charges: A bull buffalo charging a maple leaf (representing Canada) that surmounts the St George's Cross.
Compartment: The mount consists of two red maple leaves (symbolizing Canada), a thistle (for Scotland), leek (for Wales), shamrocks (for Ireland) and a rose (for England).
Supporters: A horse and a steer, representing the early Calgarian economy.
Scroll: The city motto, "Onward" between the years of incorporation as a town (1884) and as a city (1894).

The Union Flag and the Canadian Red Ensign are crossed under the scroll.

The landscape in the chief and the cross in the shield body are a reversal of the coat of arms of Alberta.

See also
Flag of Calgary

References
The City of Calgary. The City of Calgary Municipal Handbook. Calgary: The City of Calgary, 2008.

Calgary
Calgary
Calgary
Calgary
Calgary
Calgary
Calgary
Calgary
Calgary
Calgary
Calgary
Calgary